In mathematics, an indigenous bundle on a Riemann surface is a fiber bundle with a flat connection associated to some complex projective structure.

References

Riemann surfaces